Ibrahim Mohammad Jaafar (17 September 1900 –  19 February 1971) was the first Menteri Besar (Chief Minister) of Brunei, who served from 29 September 1959 until September 1961.

Background
Ibrahim was born in Labuan on Friday, 17 September 1900. His origin can be traced from the Malay Peninsula. His father was Tengku Mohammad Jaafar bin Tengku Mohammad Saat bin Tengku Merandeh. During his early years, he was educated informally from his father and he was known for his brightness. He also interested in reading history and literature, like the 'Panji Semerang', 'Seri Rama', and many other literary works.

Education
In April 1914, Ibrahim went to Labuan with his uncle, Abdul Razak. It was in Labuan that he got his formal education at English School S.P.G. till Primary 5. He was given scholarship of $90.00 by a Chinese merchant named Chee Swee Cheng. He then went to Singapore in January 1918, to further his studies.

Career
Ibrahim first worked as a clerk and a store supervisor. At this time, he also got an opportunity to learn English Language from A.V. Lingam. Six month after that, he worked as a dresser for six month. In June 1917, he went to Brunei, accompanying G.E. Cator, the British Resident of Labuan who got transferred to Brunei. He then worked as trainee at the Financial Office, and later, as a clerk at Custom Department till January 1918. While pursuing his studies, he worked at Singapore Audit Office. He returned to Brunei in December 1918. On his return, he worked as Assistant Post office clerk until December 1918. He then worked at the Resident Office and Land Department as a clerk. In March 1922, he led a delegation to Singapore to represent Brunei in the Borneo Malaya Conference.

Political involvement 
In November 1928, he was appointed as Administrative officer at the Resident's office. In March 1930, he was appointed as Assistant Land Tax Collector. In June 1932, he was appointed as Class 2 Magistrate for Brunei Muara District and not long after that, he became the District Officer of Brunei Muara until January 1936. After that, he continued to serve as an interpreter and Secretary to the British Resident until 1945.

Second World War 
During the Japanese Occupation of Brunei in 1941, he was appointed as State Secretary or chief administrative officer from 1941 till 1945 and liaison officer between the locals and the Japanese administration. He was ordered to destroy all the documents kept in the Resident's Office, including the Land Grant Books. Without fear of his safety, not obeying the commands, he managed to save all the documents. His achievements was praised by K.E.H. Kay, a British army officer.

He also dealt with the safety of the people of Brunei who was forced to work by the Japanese at Labuan, Miri, and Kuching. He also became an important figure in the administration, to whom the people could rely on. He also trained several officers on how to run the administration and Law making process. Among the officer who were trained by him were Pengiran Muda Omar Ali Saifuddien.

The Japanese administration also praised his capability as a national leader, which earned him a special place in the Japanese administration. He believed that only the Japanese could help Brunei to regain Independence. Unfortunately, his service under the Japanese did not last long. It was on his way to meet Chokan Kakka Koizumi at Buang Tekurok, he heard that the Allied Forces landed in Muara. Upon their landing, the Allied Forces called him to discuss several options on the restoration of the government. He assisted the Allied Forces to restore peace and stability in Brunei. At this time, his health problem were worrying him. Therefore, he retired from government position in 1949.

Pehin Dato Perdana Menteri 

After the death of Sultan Ahmad Tajuddin on 4 June 1950 and the ascension of Sultan Omar Ali Saifuddien III to the throne, he was appointed as Private Secretary to the Sultan. It was at this time, he was conferred the title 'Pehin Datu Perdana Menteri' in 1951, making him head of the non-noble traditional ministers. He went to accompany the Sultan on his haj pilgrimage in Mecca, and to attend the Coronation of Queen Elizabeth II in 1953 and official visit to Europe.

During his tenure as Private Secretary to the Sultan, he gave advice to the Sultan on the developments of Brunei, including the Five Year National Development Plan and the proposal on drafting the Written Constitution which came into effect on 29 September 1959, after which, he himself became Brunei's first Menteri Besar. He served in that office from 29 September 1959 until September 1961.

Speaker of the Legislative Council 
He also became the member of the Royal Council. In 1957, he led a delegation to attend the ECAFE Conference held in Bangkok. In June 1963, he was appointed Speaker of the Legislative Council, which was then dissolved on 30 January 1965. When the Legislative Council was reconvened on 31 January 1965, he was reappointed as Speaker. He was also appointed as unofficial member of the Royal Council. Still, he continued to advise the Sultan on important matters on administration. Prior to his death, he still holds the position of Secretary of State to the British Resident, taking on administrative duties.

Death
He died on Friday, 19 February 1971, after Subuh prayer. He was laid to rest at Kianggeh Dagang Cemetery, Bandar Seri Begawan. His funeral was attended by family members and several high ranking officials such as Arthur R. Adair, British High Commissioner to Brunei, Yusuf Abdul Rahim, Menteri Besar of Brunei, and many nobilities.

Personal life

Family 
He married Dayang Saadiah binti Awang Mohd Tahir on 22 December 1923. His marriage was blessed with four son:
1. Awang Abbas Al Sufri (later known as Pehin Orang Kaya Penggawa), born on 16 July 1926. (deceased)
2. Awang Anuar, born 13 March 1931 (deceased)
3. Awang Adinin, born 28 August 1932.
4. Awang Isa, born 9 May 1935. (later known as Pehin Orang Kaya Laila Setia Bakti Diraja).

Personal interests 
He was also very active in sports. He once played for the Brunei Recreation Club football team. He also played golf. He was also an avid lover of music and a skilled musician. He also well known as he like to keep record of what happened during his life. One of the record that he kept was the one about the death of his father, Mohammad Jaafar, on 9 February 1941. He recorded the name of Imam Mohammad Yusof Mohammad Salleh as the person who performed the cleansing and prayer for his father.

Honours
In recognition to his service during World War II, he was awarded the O.B.E. by the British Government for saving several important documents from being destroyed by the Japanese. It would then be promoted to C.B.E. by Queen Elizabeth II in 1959. In 1951, he was awarded the title of Pehin Datu Perdana Menteri. Additionally he was also awarded Order of the Rising Sun Third Class by the Japanese Government during World War II. Throughout his career, he has earned the following awards;

National 
  Family Order of Seri Utama (DK) – Dato Seri Utama
  Order of Seri Paduka Mahkota Brunei First Class (SPMB) – Dato Seri Paduka
  Order of Setia Negara Brunei (DSNB) – Dato Setia
  Omar Ali Saifuddin Medal (POAS) 
  Meritorious Service Medal (PJK)

Foreign 
 :
  Order of the British Empire Commander (CBE) – (1959)
 :
  Order of the Rising Sun Third Class – (1944–1945)

References

1902 births
1971 deaths
Government ministers of Brunei
Bruneian Muslims
Bruneian politicians
Chief Ministers of Brunei
People from Labuan
Speakers of Legislative Council of Brunei